À l'aventure is a 2008 French erotic drama film written and directed by Jean-Claude Brisseau. The film showed at the 2009 International Film Festival Rotterdam.

Plot
Sandrine, a young and childless woman, meets a friend for a sandwich lunch on a park bench. Also on the bench is an old man who tries to start a conversation. Her friend is annoyed and leaves, but Sandrine is intrigued by the old man's remarks: the seed of independence has been planted in her. She stands up to her boyfriend, who leaves her, and quits her dull job. 

In a café she sees Greg, a handsome young man who is studying a book on psychiatry, and asks him to tell her about it. They end up spending the afternoon in a hotel room making love. He asks her to a dinner party where she can meet Mina, a woman whose approach to a man is total submission, allowing him to do what he wants. He puts Mina under hypnosis and she regresses to being a Flemish nun in the 1400s.

In time, Sandrine finds that her journey with Greg and Mina into multiple sexual and spiritual encounters is not bringing enlightenment or fulfilment. She tells the old man, who she has kept in touch with, and he says that it has all been immature and dangerous. He advises her to root herself back in reality.

Cast
 Carole Brana as Sandrine
 Arnaud Binard as Greg
 Étienne Chicot as the bench man
 Jocelyn Quivrin as Fred
  as Sophie
 Nadia Chibani as Mina
  as Françoise
 Frédéric Aspisi as Jérôme
 Michèle Larue as Sandrine's mother
 Manica Brini as Sandrine's sister

References

External links
 
 

2008 films
2008 drama films
2008 LGBT-related films
2000s erotic drama films
2000s French-language films
French erotic drama films
French LGBT-related films
BDSM in films
Bisexuality-related films
Female bisexuality in film
Lesbian-related films
LGBT-related drama films
Films about hypnosis
Films directed by Jean-Claude Brisseau
2000s French films